The Northrop Grumman E-2 Hawkeye is an American all-weather, carrier-capable tactical airborne early warning (AEW) aircraft. This twin-turboprop aircraft was designed and developed during the late 1950s and early 1960s by the Grumman Aircraft Company for the United States Navy as a replacement for the earlier, piston-engined E-1 Tracer, which was rapidly becoming obsolete. The aircraft's performance has been upgraded with the E-2B and E-2C versions, where most of the changes were made to the radar and radio communications due to advances in electronic integrated circuits and other electronics. The fourth major version of the Hawkeye is the E-2D, which first flew in 2007. The E-2 was the first aircraft designed specifically for its role, as opposed to a modification of an existing airframe, such as the Boeing E-3 Sentry. Variants of the Hawkeye have been in continuous production since 1960, giving it the longest production run of any carrier-based aircraft.

The E-2 also received the nickname "Super Fudd" because it replaced the WF (later E-1) "Willy Fudd". In recent decades, the E-2 has been commonly referred to as the "Hummer" because of the distinctive sounds of its turboprop engines, quite unlike that of turbojet and turbofan jet engines. In addition to U.S. Navy service, smaller numbers of E-2s have been sold to the armed forces of Egypt, France, Israel, Japan, Mexico, Singapore and Taiwan.

Grumman also used the basic layout of the E-2 to produce the Grumman C-2 Greyhound cargo aircraft.

Development

Background
Continual improvements in airborne radars through 1956 led to the construction of AEW airplanes by several different countries and several different armed forces. The functions of command and control and sea and air surveillance were also added. The first carrier-based aircraft to perform these missions for the U.S. Navy and its allies was the Douglas AD Skyraider, which was replaced in US Navy service by the Grumman E-1 Tracer, which was a modified version of the S-2 Tracker twin-engine anti-submarine warfare aircraft, where the radar was carried in an aerofoil-shaped radome carried above the aircraft's fuselage.

E-2A and E-2B Hawkeye
In 1956, the U.S. Navy developed a requirement for an airborne early warning aircraft where its data could be integrated into the Naval Tactical Data System aboard the Navy's ships, with a design from Grumman being selected to meet this requirement in March 1957. Its design, initially designated W2F-1, but later redesignated the E-2A Hawkeye, was the first carrier plane that had been designed from its wheels up as an AEW and command and control airplane. The design engineers at Grumman faced immense challenges, including the requirement that the aircraft be able to operate from the older modified s. These vessels were built during World War II and were smaller than modern carriers, being later modified to allow them to operate jet aircraft. Consequently, various height, weight and length restrictions had to be factored into the E-2A design, resulting in some handling characteristics which were less than ideal. However, the E-2A never operated from the modified Essex class carriers.

The first prototype, acting as an aerodynamic testbed only, flew on 21 October 1960. The first fully equipped aircraft followed it on 19 April 1961 and entered service with the US Navy as the E-2A in January 1964. By 1965, the project had accumulated so many development issues that it was cancelled after 59 aircraft had already been built. In particular, difficulties were being experienced due to inadequate cooling in the closely packed avionics compartment. Early computers and complex avionics systems generated considerable heat and could fail without proper ventilation. These issues continued long after the aircraft entered service. At one point, reliability was so bad that the entire fleet of aircraft was grounded.

After Navy officials had been forced to explain to Congress why four production contracts had been signed before avionics testing had been completed, action was taken; Grumman and the US Navy scrambled to improve the design. The unreliable rotary drum computer was replaced by a Litton L-304 digital computer and various avionics systems were replaced – the upgraded aircraft were designated E-2Bs. In total, 49 of the 59 E-2As were upgraded to E-2B standard. These aircraft replaced the E-1B Tracers in the various US Navy AEW squadrons.

E-2C Hawkeye and upgrades

Although the upgraded E-2B was a vast improvement on the unreliable E-2A, it was an interim measure. The US Navy knew the design had much greater capability and had yet to achieve the performance and reliability parameters set out in the original 1957 design. In April 1968, a reliability improvement program was initiated. In addition, now that the capabilities of the aircraft were starting to be realized, more were desired; 28 new E-2Cs were ordered to augment the 49 E-2Bs that would be upgraded. Improvements in the new and upgraded aircraft were concentrated in the radar and computer performance.

Two E-2A test machines were modified as E-2C prototypes, the first flying on 20 January 1971. Trials proved satisfactory and the E-2C was ordered into production. The first production aircraft performed its initial flight on 23 September 1972. The original E-2C, known as Group 0, consisted of 55 aircraft; the first aircraft became operational in 1973 and serving on carriers in the 1980s and 1990s, until they were replaced in first-line service by Group II aircraft. US Navy Reserve used some aircraft for tracking drug smugglers. The type was commonly used in conjunction with Grumman F-14 Tomcat fighters; monitoring airspace and then vectoring Tomcats over the Link-4A datalink to destroy potential threats with long range AIM-54C Phoenix missiles.

The next production run, between 1988 and 1991, saw 18 aircraft built to the Group I standard. Group I aircraft replaced the E-2's older APS-125 radar and T56-A-425 turboprops with their successors, the APS-139 radar system and T56-A-427 turboprops. The first Group I aircraft entered service in August 1981. Upgrading the Group 0 aircraft to Group I specifications was considered, but the cost was comparable to a new production aircraft, so upgrades were not conducted. Group I aircraft were only flown by the Atlantic fleet squadrons. This version was followed within a few years by the Group II, which had the improved APS-145 radar.  A total of 50 Group II aircraft were delivered, 12 being upgraded Group I aircraft. This new version entered service in June 1992 and served with the Pacific and Atlantic Fleet squadrons.

By 1997, the US Navy intended that all front line squadrons would be equipped, for a total of 75 Group II aircraft. Grumman merged with Northrop in 1994 and plans began on the Group II Plus, also known as the Group II / NAV upgrade. This kept the same computer and radar as the Group II while upgrading the pilot avionics, such as replacing the mechanical Inertial Navigation System (INS) with a more reliable and accurate laser Ring Gyroscope-driven INS, installing dual Multifunction Display Units (MFCDUs) (vice one in the Group II) and integrating GPS into the weapon system. A variant of the Group II with upgrades to the mission computer and CIC workstations is referred to as the MCU/ACIS, these were produced in small numbers due to production of the Hawkeye 2000 soon after its introduction. All Group II aircraft had their 1960s vintage computer processors replaced by a mission computer with the same functionality via modern computer technology, referred to as the GrIIM RePr (Group II Mission Computer Replacement Program, pronounced "grim reaper").

Another upgrade to the Group II was the Hawkeye 2000, which featured the same APS-145 radar but incorporated an upgraded mission computer and CIC (Combat Information Center) workstations (Advanced Control Indicator Set or ACIS and carries the U.S. Navy's new CEC (cooperative engagement capability) data-link system. It is also fitted with a larger capacity vapor cycle avionics cooling system.  Starting in 2007 a hardware and software upgrade package began to be added to existing Hawkeye 2000 aircraft. This upgrade allows faster processing, double current trackfile capacity and access to satellite information networks. Hawkeye 2000 cockpits being upgraded include solid-state glass displays and a GPS-approach capability. The remaining Hawkeye Group II NAV Upgrade aircraft received GPS approach capability, but did not get the solid-state glass displays.

In 2004, the E-2C's propeller system was changed; a new eight-bladed propeller system named NP2000 was developed by the Hamilton-Sundstrand company to replace the old four-bladed design. Improvements included reduced vibrations and better maintainability as a result of the ability to remove prop blades individually instead of having to remove the entire prop and hub assembly. The propeller blades are of carbon fiber construction with steel leading edge inserts and de-icing boots at the root of the blade.

E-2D Advanced Hawkeye

Once considered for replacement by the "Common Support Aircraft", this concept was abandoned. The latest E-2 version is the E-2D Advanced Hawkeye, which features an entirely new avionics suite including the new AN/APY-9 radar, radio suite, mission computer, integrated satellite communications, flight management system, improved T56-A-427A engines, a glass cockpit and aerial refueling. The APY-9 radar features an active electronically scanned array (AESA), which adds electronic scanning to the mechanical rotation of the radar in its radome. The E-2D includes provisions for the copilot to act as a "Tactical 4th Operator" (T4O), who can reconfigure his main cockpit display to show radar, IFF, Link 16 (JTIDS)/CEC and access all acquired data. The E-2D's first flight occurred on 3 August 2007. On 8 May 2009, an E-2D used its Cooperative Engagement Capability system to engage an overland cruise missile with a Standard Missile SM-6 fired from another platform in an integrated fire-control system test. These two systems will form the basis of the Naval Integrated Fire Control – Counter Air (NIFC-CA) when fielded in 2015; the USN is investigating adding other systems to the NIFC-CA network in the future.

The APY-9 radar has been suspected of being capable of detecting fighter-sized stealth aircraft, which are typically optimized against high frequencies like Ka, Ku, X, C and parts of the S-bands. Small aircraft lack the size or weight allowances for all-spectrum low-observable features, leaving a vulnerability to detection by the UHF-band APY-9 radar, potentially detecting fifth-generation fighters like the Russian Sukhoi Su-57 and the Chinese Chengdu J-20 and Shenyang J-31. Historically, UHF radars had resolution and detection issues that made them ineffective for accurate targeting and fire control; Northrop Grumman and Lockheed claim that the APY-9 has solved these shortcomings in the APY-9 using advanced electronic scanning and high digital computing power via space/time adaptive processing. According to the Navy's NIFC-CA concept, the E-2D could guide fleet weapons, such as AIM-120 AMRAAM and SM-6 missiles, onto targets beyond a launch platform's detection range or capabilities.

Deliveries of initial production E-2Ds began in 2010. On 4 February 2010, Delta One conducted the first E-2D carrier landing aboard USS Harry S. Truman as a part of carrier suitability testing. On 27 September 2011, an E-2D was successfully launched by the prototype Electromagnetic Aircraft Launch System (EMALS) at Naval Air Engineering Station Lakehurst.  On 12 February 2013, the Office of the Secretary of Defense approved the E-2D to enter full-rate production. The Navy plans for an initial operational capability by 2015. In June 2013, the 10th E-2D was delivered to the Navy, with an additional 10 aircraft in various stages of manufacturing and predelivery flight testing. On 18 July 2013, Northrop Grumman was awarded a $113.7 million contract for five full-rate production Lot 2 E-2D Advanced Hawkeye aircraft. On 13 August 2013, Northrop Grumman was awarded a $617 million contract for five E-2Ds until full-rate production Lot 1. On 30 June 2014, Northrop Grumman was awarded a $3.6 billion contract to supply 25 more E-2D, for a total contracted number of 50 aircraft; 13 E-2D models had been delivered by that time.

In December 2016, an E-2D flew for the first time fitted with an aerial refueling capability. This feature will allow the aircraft to double its time on station to five hours and increase total mission time from four to seven hours. The refueling modification will start being built into the 46th plane (out of 75 planned) for delivery in late 2020 costing an additional $2 million per aircraft and the Navy plans to retrofit the feature on all previous Hawkeyes for $6 million per plane.

Design

The E-2 is a high-wing airplane, with one Allison T56 turboprop engine (5250 shp rating) on each wing and retractable tricycle landing gear. As with all carrier-borne airplanes, the E-2 is equipped with a tail hook for recovery (landing) and the nose gear can attach to a shuttle of the aircraft carrier's catapults for launch (takeoff). A distinguishing feature of the Hawkeye is its 24-foot (7.3 m) diameter rotating radar dome (rotodome) that is mounted above its fuselage and wings. This carries the E-2's primary antennas for its long-range radar and IFF systems. No other carrier-borne aircraft possesses one of these. Land-based aircraft with rotodomes include the Boeing E-3 Sentry, a larger AWACS airplane operated by the U.S. Air Force and NATO air forces in large numbers. The similarly placed stationary radome of the E-2's piston-engined predecessor, the E-1 Tracer, also mandated the E-2's adoption of a modern version of the Grumman Sto-Wing folding wing system, preventing the folded wing panels from making contact with the E-2's rotodome.

The aircraft is operated by a crew of five, with the pilot and co-pilot on the flight deck and the combat information center officer, air control officer and radar operator stations located in the rear fuselage directly beneath the rotodome.

In U.S. service, the E-2 Hawkeye provides all-weather airborne early warning and command and control capabilities for all aircraft-carrier battle groups. In addition, its other purposes include sea and land surveillance, the control of the aircraft carrier's fighter planes for air defense, the control of strike aircraft on offensive missions, the control of search and rescue missions for naval aviators and sailors lost at sea, relaying radio communications, air-to-air and ship-to-air. It can also serve in an air traffic control capacity in emergency situations when land-based ATC is unavailable.

The E-2C and E-2D Hawkeyes use advanced electronic sensors combined with digital computer signal processing, especially its radars, for early warning of enemy aircraft attacks and anti-ship missile attacks, controlling the carrier's combat air patrol (CAP) fighters, and secondarily for surveillance of the surrounding sea and land for enemy warships and guided-missile launchers and any other electronic surveillance missions as directed.

Operational history

US Navy

The E-2A entered U.S. Navy service in January 1964 and in April 1964 with VAW-11 at NAS North Island. The first deployment was aboard the aircraft carrier  during 1965.

Since entering combat during the Vietnam War, the E-2 has served the US Navy around the world, acting as the electronic "eyes of the fleet".

In August 1981, a Hawkeye from VAW-124 "Bear Aces" directed two F-14 Tomcats from VF-41 "Black Aces" in an intercept mission in the Gulf of Sidra that resulted in the downing of two Libyan Sukhoi Su-22s. Hawkeyes from VAW-123 aboard the aircraft carrier  directed a group of F-14 Tomcat fighters flying the Combat Air Patrol during Operation El Dorado Canyon, the joint strike of two Carrier Battle Groups in the Mediterranean Sea against Libyan terrorist targets during 1986.

More recently, E-2Cs provided the command and control for both aerial warfare and land-attack missions during the Persian Gulf War. Hawkeyes have supported the U.S. Coast Guard, the U.S. Customs Service, and American federal and state police forces during anti-drug operations.

In the mid-1980s, several U.S. Navy E-2Cs were made available to the U.S. Coast Guard and the U.S. Customs Service for counter-narcotics (CN) and maritime interdiction operations (MIO). This also led to the Coast Guard building a small cadre of Naval Flight Officers (NFOs), starting with the recruitment and interservice transfer of Navy flight officers with E-2 flight experience and the flight training of other junior Coast Guard officers as NFOs. A fatal aircraft mishap on 24 August 1990 involving a Coast Guard E-2C at the former Naval Station Roosevelt Roads in Puerto Rico prompted the Coast Guard to discontinue flying E-2Cs and to return its E-2Cs to the Navy. The U.S Customs Service also returned its E-2Cs to the Navy and concentrated on the use of former U.S. Navy P-3 Orion aircraft in the CN role.

E-2C Hawkeye squadrons played a critical role in air operations during Operation Desert Storm. In one instance, a Hawkeye crew provided critical air control direction to two F/A-18 Hornet aircrew, resulting in the shootdown of two Iraqi MiG-21s. During Operations Southern Watch and Desert Fox, Hawkeye crews continued to provide thousands of hours of air coverage, while providing air-to-air and air-to-ground command and control in a number of combat missions.

The E-2 Hawkeye is a crucial component of all U.S. Navy carrier air wings; each carrier is equipped with four Hawkeyes (five in some situations), allowing for continuous 24-hour-a-day operation of at least one E-2 and for one or two to undergo maintenance in the aircraft carrier's hangar deck at all times. Until 2005, the US Navy Hawkeyes were organized into East and West coast wings, supporting the respective fleets. However, the East coast wing was disestablished, all aircraft were organized into a single wing based at Point Mugu, California. Six E-2C aircraft were deployed by the US Naval Reserve for drug interdiction and homeland security operations until 9 March 2013, when the sole Reserve squadron, VAW-77 'Nightwolves', was decommissioned and its six aircraft sent to other squadrons.

During Operation Enduring Freedom and Operation Iraqi Freedom all ten Regular Navy Hawkeye squadrons flew overland sorties. They provided battle management for attack of enemy ground targets, close-air-support coordination, combat search and rescue control, airspace management, as well as datalink and communication relay for both land and naval forces. During the aftermath of Hurricane Katrina, three Hawkeye squadrons (two Regular Navy and one Navy Reserve) were deployed in support of civilian relief efforts including Air Traffic Control responsibilities spanning three states, and the control of U.S. Army, U.S. Navy, U.S. Air Force, U.S. Marine Corps, U.S. Coast Guard and Army National Guard and Air National Guard helicopter rescue units.

Hawkeye 2000s first deployed in 2003 aboard  with VAW-117, the "Wallbangers" (formerly the "Nighthawks") and CVW-11. U.S. Navy E-2C Hawkeyes have been upgraded with eight-bladed propellers as part of the NP2000 program; the first squadron to cruise with the new propellers was VAW-124 "Bear Aces".

VAW-120, the E-2C fleet replacement squadron began receiving E-2D Advanced Hawkeyes for training use in July 2010. On 27 March 2014, the first E-2Ds were delivered to the VAW-125. The E-2D achieved Initial Operational Capability (IOC) in October 2014 when VAW-125 was certified to have five operational aircraft. This began training on the aircraft for its first operational deployment, scheduled for 2015 aboard . The E-2D will play a larger role than that of the E-2C, with five E-2Ds aboard each carrier instead of the current four C-models, requiring the acquisition of 75 total E-2Ds. On 11 March 2015, the Theodore Roosevelt Carrier Strike Group departed Naval Station Norfolk and returned to port on 23 November 2015, concluding the first operational use of the E-2D.

Other operators
E-2 Hawkeyes have been sold by the U.S. Federal Government under Foreign Military Sales (FMS) procedures to the armed forces of Egypt, France, Israel, Japan, Singapore and Taiwan.

Egypt
Egypt purchased five E-2C Hawkeyes, that entered service in 1987 and were upgraded to Hawkeye 2000 standard. One additional upgraded E-2C was purchased. The first upgraded aircraft was delivered in March 2003 and deliveries were concluded in late 2008. Egypt requested two additional excess E-2C aircraft in October 2007; deliveries began in 2010.  They all operate in 601 AEW Brigade, Cairo-West.

Egypt used the E-2C Hawkeye in a bombing operation in 2015 against ISIL in Libya.

France

The French Naval Aviation (Aeronavale) operates three E-2C Hawkeyes and has been the only operator of the E-2 Hawkeye from an aircraft carrier besides the U.S. Navy. The French nuclear-powered carrier, currently carries two E-2C Hawkeyes on her combat patrols offshore. The third French E-2C Hawkeye has been upgraded with eight-bladed propellers as part of the NP2000 program. In April 2007, France requested the purchase of an additional aircraft.

The Flottille 4F of the French Navy's Aeronavale was stood up on 2 July 2000 and flies its E-2C Hawkeyes from its naval air station at Lann-Bihoue, deploying to the  Charles de Gaulle. They took part in operations in Afghanistan and Libya.

In September 2019 Florence Parly, French Minister of the Armed Forces, announced that three new E-2D Advanced Hawkeyes would be purchased in 2020 to replace the E-2Cs in service.

Japan
On 6 September 1976, Soviet Air Forces pilot Viktor Belenko successfully defected, landing his MiG-25 'Foxbat' at Hakodate Airport, Japan. During this incident, the Japan Self-Defense Forces' (JASDF) radar lost track of the aircraft when Belenko flew his MiG-25 at a low altitude, prompting the JASDF to consider procurement of airborne early warning aircraft.

Initially, the E-3 Sentry airborne warning and control system aircraft was considered to be the prime candidate for the airborne early warning mission by the JASDF. However, the Japanese Defense Agency realized that the E-3 would not be readily available due to USAF needs and opted to procure E-2 Hawkeye aircraft. The Japan Air Self-Defense Force bought thirteen E-2C aircraft to improve its early warning capabilities. The E-2C was put into service with the Airborne Early Warning Group (AEWG) at Misawa Air Base in January 1987.

On 21 November 2014, the Japanese Ministry of Defense officially decided to procure the E-2D version of the Hawkeye, instead of the Boeing 737 AEW&C design.  In June 2015, the Japanese government requested to buy four E-2Ds through a Foreign Military Sale.

In September 2018 the Defense Security Cooperation Agency (DSCA) notified Congress of the possible sale of up to nine E-2Ds to Japan.

A sale of up to five E-2Ds for JASDF was approved by the U.S. State Department and DSCA notified Congress on 7 March 2023. The sale includes ancillary equipment, spares and training support for an estimated $1.38 billion. The proposed five E-2Ds are in addition to the six E-2Ds Japan already has and the seven more it has on order. However, the Japanese Ministry of Defense did not reveal in its most recent proposed budget any intention to acquire more aircraft.

Mexico
In 2004, three former Israel Air Force E-2C aircraft were sold to the Mexican Navy to perform maritime and shore surveillance missions. These aircraft were upgraded locally by IAI. The first Mexican E-2C was rolled out in January 2004.

Singapore

The Republic of Singapore Air Force acquired four Grumman E-2C Hawkeye airborne early warning aircraft in 1987, which are assigned to the 111 Squadron "Jaeger" based at Tengah Air Base.

In April 2007, it was announced that the four E-2C Hawkeyes were to be replaced with four Gulfstream G550s which would become the primary early warning aircraft of the Singapore Air Force. On 13 April 2012, the newer G550 AEWs officially took over duty from the former. Singapore has close ties with the Israel military which has also acquired the G550 AEW.

Israel
Israel was the first export customer; its four Hawkeyes were delivered during 1981, complete with the folding wings characteristic of carrier-borne aircraft.

The four examples were soon put into active service before and during the 1982 Lebanon War during which they won a resounding victory over Syrian air defenses and fighter control. They were central to the Israeli victory in the air battles over the Bekaa Valley during which over 90 Syrian fighters were downed. The Hawkeyes were also the linchpins of the operation in which the IAF destroyed the surface-to-air missile (SAM) array in the Bekaa, coordinating the various stages of the operation, vectoring planes into bombing runs and directing intercepts. Under constant escort by F-15 Eagles, there were always two Hawkeyes on station off the Lebanese coast, controlling the various assets in the air and detecting any Syrian aircraft upon their takeoff, eliminating any chance of surprise.

The Israeli Air Force (IAF) operated four E-2s for its homeland AEW protection through 1994. The IAF was the first user of the E-2 to install air-to-air refueling equipment.

Three of the four Israeli-owned Hawkeyes were sold to Mexico in 2002 after they had been upgraded with new systems; the remaining example was sent to be displayed in the Israeli Air Force Museum. In 2010, Singapore began retiring its E-2Cs as well. Both Israel and Singapore now employ the Israel Aerospace Industries (IAI) Eitam, a Gulfstream G550-based platform with Elta's EL/W-2085 sensor package (a newer derivative of the airborne Phalcon system) for their national AEW programs.

Taiwan

Taiwan acquired four E-2T aircraft from the US on 22 November 1995.  On 15 April 2006 Taiwan commissioned two new E-2K Hawkeyes at an official ceremony at the Republic of China Air Force (ROCAF) base in Pingtung Airport in southern Taiwan.

The four E-2Ts were approved for upgrade to Hawkeye 2000 configuration in a 2008 arms deal. The four E-2T aircraft were upgraded to what became known as E-2K standard in two batches, the first batch of two aircraft were sent to the United States in June 2010, arriving home in late 2011; on their return the second batch of two aircraft were sent for upgrade, returning to Taiwan in March 2013.

Offers
In August 2009, the U.S. Navy and Northrop Grumman briefed the Indian Navy on the E-2D Advanced Hawkeye on its potential use to satisfy its current shore-based and future carrier-based Airborne Early Warning and Control (AEW&C) requirements. The Indian Navy has reportedly expressed interest in acquiring up to six Hawkeyes.

Variants

W2F-1  Original designation of the Hawkeye, changed to E-2A in 1962.
E-2A  Initial production version, was W2F-1 before 1962. 59 built.
TE-2A  Two E-2As converted as crew trainers.
YC-2A  Two E-2As, BUNOs 148147 and 148148, converted as prototypes of the C-2 Greyhound
E-2B  As E-2A but fitted with improved computing, enlarged outer fins. 52 converted from E-2A.
YE-2C  Two E-2As, BUNOs 148712 and 148713, converted as E-2C prototypes. Designated as YE-2C and NE-2C respectively.  These airframes then finished out their useful life being used as TE-2C pilot trainers.
E-2C  As the E-2B but with all new electronics, surveillance radar and search radar, 63 built. In "plus-models" the E-2C also has upgraded turboprop engines.
E-2C Group 0
 Initial production version of E-2C, fitted with AN/APS-120 or AN/APS-125 radar. Lengthened nose compared to earlier versions
E-2C Group I
New radar (AN/APS-139), plus upgraded mission computer and upgraded engines. 18 new build aircraft.
E-2C Group 2
AN/APS-145 radar, further improved electronics.
E-2C Group 2 Plus (Nav Upgrade)
Avionics upgrade, inclusion of GPS into weapon system.
E-2C Hawkeye 2000
New mission computer, Cooperative Engagement Capability (CEC) and additional satellite communications aerial. Originally designated Group 2+.
E-2D  A variant with new avionics suite, improved engines, a new "glass cockpit" and the potential for air-to-air refueling.
E-2T/K  E-2C variant for Republic of China (Taiwan), with parts taken from retired E-2Bs (USN BuNos 151709, 151710, 151724, 152479). However, these aircraft have the same level of electronics as the E-2C Group II Hawkeyes with their APS-145 radars and are referred to as E-2T, with "T" standing for Taiwan. On July 31, 1999, Taiwan was approved to acquire two additional E-2s built to Hawkeye 2000 standard. Later, the four original E-2Ts were also upgraded to the same standard. The upgraded aircraft were referred to as E-2Ks.

Operators

 Egyptian Air Force

 French Navy
Flottille 4F (E-2C Hawkeye 2000)

As of March 2023, the JASDF operated 10 E-2Cs and six E-2Ds.
 Japan Air Self-Defense Force
 601st Squadron (E-2C) & (E-2D)
 603rd Squadron (E-2C) & (E-2D)

 Mexican Navy
 1st Early Warning and Reconnaissance Naval Air Squadron

 Republic of China Air Force

 United States Navy
 VAW-113
 VAW-115
 VAW-116
 VAW-117
 VAW-120
 VAW-121
 VAW-123
 VAW-124
 VAW-125
 VAW-126
 VX-20
 VX-30
 VX-1
 Carrier Airborne Early Warning Weapons School

Former operators 

 Israeli Air Force
 192 Squadron

 Republic of Singapore Air Force
 111 Squadron

 U.S. Coast Guard
 U.S. Navy (decommissioned squadrons)
 VAW-11
 VAW-12
 VAW-77
 VAW-78
 VAW-88
 VAW-110
 VAW-112
 VAW-114
 VAW-122
 VAW-127

In popular culture

Aircraft on display

 E-2B, BuNo 150540, National Naval Aviation Museum, Naval Air Station Pensacola, Florida
 E-2B, BuNo 152476, Patuxent River Naval Air Museum, NAS Patuxent River, Maryland
 E-2B, BuNo 152484, Air Victory Museum, Lumberton, New Jersey
 E-2B, BuNo 150541, NAS Norfolk Air Park (adjacent Gate 4), Naval Station Norfolk/Chambers Field (former NAS Norfolk), Virginia.  Early E-2C variant nose cap installed for static display.
 E-2C, BuNo 159496, Naval Air Station Fallon, Nevada.
 E-2C, BuNo 160012, Garden City, NY as part of Cradle of Naval Aviation Display
 E-2C, 944, Israeli Air Force Museum, Hatzerim Air Base, Israel
 E-2C, BuNo 160992, on base memorial display, NAS Point Mugu, California
 E-2C, BuNo 161227, flight deck display aboard USS Midway Museum, San Diego, California
 E-2C, BuNo 161098, on display at former NAS Atlanta, GA
 E-2C, BuNo 161344, awaiting restoration at Yanks Air Museum, Chino, CA
 E-2C, BuNo 162796, Republic of Singapore Air Force Museum, 400 Airport Road, Singapore
 E-2C, BuNo 164494, National Naval Aviation Museum, Naval Air Station Pensacola, FL. This aircraft was the last to launch from  prior to her inactivation.

Specifications (E-2C)

See also

References

Notes

Bibliography
 Donald, David, ed. "E-2 Hawkeye". Warplanes of the Fleet. AIRtime, 2004. .
 
 Godfrey, David W. H. "Hawkeye:A New Dimension in Tactical Warfare". Air International, January 1977, Vol 12 No 1. Bromley, UK:Fine Scroll. pp. 7–13, 42–44.
 Jackson, Mark. Jane's All The World's Aircraft 2003–2004. Coulsdon, UK: Jane's Information Group, 2003. .
 Neubeck, Ken. E-2 Hawkeye Walk Around. Squadron/Signal Publications, 2008. .
 Swanborough, Gordon and Peter M. Bowers. United States Navy Aircraft since 1911. London:Putnam, Second edition, 1976. .
 Taylor, John W. R. Jane's All The World's Aircraft 1976–77. London:Jane's Yearbooks, 1976. .
 Winchester, Jim. "E-2 Hawkeye Developments". Air International, December 2005, Vol 69 No 6. Stamford, UK:Key Publishing. pp. 46–49.
 Winchester, Jim, ed. Military Aircraft of the Cold War (The Aviation Factfile). London: Grange Books plc, 2006. .

External links

 E-2 fact file  and E-2C Hawkeye history page on US Navy site 
 E-2 page on GlobalSecurity.org
 E-2D Hawkeye: The Navy's New AWACS on Defense Industry Daily
 "Northrop Grumman E-2D Advanced Hawkeye Completes First Flight", Northrop Grumman, 3 August 2007
 Gallery of photographs of the French E-2C Hawkeye on NetMarine.net 
 Taiwan Air Power E-2T page 

E-02 Hawkeye
E-02 Hawkeye
1960s United States military reconnaissance aircraft
Carrier-based aircraft
AWACS aircraft
High-wing aircraft
Twin-turboprop tractor aircraft
Aircraft first flown in 1960